Will James (born 22 December 1976 in Plymouth, England) is a former Wales international rugby union player. He most recently played for Gloucester Rugby, and has also played for Pontypool RFC, Pontypridd RFC and Cornish Pirates.

A Wales international James made his international debut for Wales in a friendly match against England at Twickenham in August 2007. He was selected for the Wales squad for the 2007 Rugby World Cup held in France. On 2 April 2013, it was announced that James had signed a one-year contract extension to keep him at Gloucester until the end of the 2013–2014 season.

On 23 January 2014 it was announced that Will James would retire at the end of the season.

Will James is currently the Head of Rugby, Sports Development and Performance at Ampleforth College. A Private school in North Yorkshire.

References

External links
Gloucester Rugby profile
Wales profile
Pontypridd RFC profile

1976 births
Living people
Cornish Pirates players
Gloucester Rugby players
People educated at Plymouth College
Pontypridd RFC players
Rugby union players from Plymouth, Devon
Sportspeople from Gloucestershire
Wales international rugby union players
Welsh rugby union players
Rugby union locks